USNS Richard G. Matthiesen (T-AOT-1124) was one of four tankers, known as T5s, with double hulls ice-strengthened for protection against damage during missions in extreme climates. She was part of Military Sealift Command's Sealift Program, transporting fuel for the Department of Defense. Richard G. Matthiesen had missions including refueling the National Science Foundation in Antarctica and Thule Air Base in Greenland. She was named after Richard G Matthiesen, a Merchant Marine Distinguished Service Medal recipient. 

Richard G. Matthiesen went out of service on March 31 2011 and transferred to the Maritime Commission for disposal.

References

Article about delivery of fuel to Antarctica
Richard G. Matthiesen citation

1986 ships
Champion-class tankers